Car and Driver (CD or C/D) is an American automotive enthusiast magazine. In 2006 its total circulation was 1.23 million. It is owned by Hearst Magazines, who purchased it from its prior owner Hachette Filipacchi Media U.S. in 2011. It was founded as  Sports Cars Illustrated.  The magazine is based in Ann Arbor, Michigan.

History

Car and Driver was founded as Sports Cars Illustrated in 1955. In its early years, the magazine focused primarily on small, imported sports cars. In 1961, editor Karl Ludvigsen renamed the magazine Car and Driver to show a more general automotive focus.

Car and Driver once featured Bruce McCall,  Jean Shepherd, and Brock Yates  as columnists, and P. J. O'Rourke as a frequent contributor.  Former editors include William Jeanes and David E. Davis, Jr., the latter of whom led some employees to defect in 1985 to create Automobile.

Rather than electing a Car of the Year, Car and Driver publishes its top ten picks each year in its Car and Driver 10Best.

Car and Driver is home to the John Lingenfelter Memorial Trophy. This award is given annually at their Supercar Challenge.

Currently, Car and Driver is also published in Germany, Switzerland, the United Kingdom, and Spain. The Spanish version just makes use of the Car and Driver name; no editorial direction is shared. China had an edition called 名车志 Car and Driver. The Middle Eastern edition is issued by ITP Publishing based in Dubai.

Editorial direction

The magazine is notable for its irreverent tone and habit of "telling it like it is," especially with regard to underperforming automobiles ("Saturn folks like to point out that the L200 has little in common with the Opel Vectra from which it borrows some platform architecture, and we have to wonder why. Could the Opel be worse?"—Feb 2003). The magazine also frequently delves into controversial issues, especially in regard to politics. The editorial slant of the magazine is decidedly pro-automobile. However, the intrusion of politics into editorial columns rarely intrudes into reviews of cars themselves or feature articles. For example, the columnists have been highly critical of SUVs on the basis that minivans or car-based utes are almost always better, more drivable choices.

The magazine was one of the first to be unabashedly critical of the American automakers. However, it has been quick to praise noteworthy efforts like the Ford Focus and Chevrolet Corvette.

The magazine has been at the center of a few controversies based on this editorial direction, including the following:

 Their instrumented testing is extremely rigorous compared with other automotive magazines. It has twice revealed false power claims by manufacturers: Both the 1999 SVT Mustang Cobra and 2001 Mazda Miata tests showed these vehicles not producing performance equivalents to their claimed power output. In both cases, the manufacturers' claims were proved wrong, forcing buybacks and apologies.

Sometimes the magazine might go a little out of the boundaries and (in the Sept. 1990 issue of C/D on page 83) had the nerves of steel to operate an GM-EMD SD60 and saw how a locomotive was made and test one out before it was delivered to the Kansas City Southern Railway.

Car and Driver and Road & Track are sister publications at Hearst and have for many years shared the same advertising, sales, marketing, and circulation departments. However, their editorial operations are distinct and they have separate publishers.
Car and Driver started to include lateral acceleration figures in their road tests decades later than Road & Track.

Website 
Car and Driver operates a website that features articles (both original and from print), a blog, an automotive buyer's guide (with AccuPayment, a price-calculating tool), and a social networking site called Backfires.  As had occurred with other online auto magazines, Car and Driver first suspended its popular Backfires column in 2020; then, did make a partial effort in 2021 to continue with readers' comments, but eventually found, like the other magazines, the effort was too costly and often too divisive.

Car and Driver Television
Car and Driver Television was the television counterpart that formerly aired on TNN/SpikeTV's Powerblock weekend lineup from 1999 to 2005. It was produced by RTM Productions and hosted by Jim Scoutten—who also hosted American Shooter, another RTM production—until 2003. Thereafter the usual host was Larry Webster, one of the magazine's editors, with Csaba Csere adding occasional commentary and news.

Car and Driver computer game 
In 1993, Car and Driver licensed its name for a PC game to Electronic Arts entitled Car and Driver. The game was in 3D, and the courses included racing circuits, an oval track, automobile route racing with traffic, a dragstrip, and an autocross circuit.

The ten vehicles included the Porsche 959, Ferrari F40, Lotus Esprit, Eagle Talon, and the Ferrari 512.

The "Cannonball Run" 
In the 1970s, to celebrate the Interstate Highway System and to protest speed limits, reporter Brock Yates and editor Steve Smith conceived the idea of an unsanctioned, informal race across the country, replicating the 53.5-hour transcontinental drive made by car and bike pilot Erwin George "Cannonball" Baker in 1933. The New York to Los Angeles Cannonball Baker Sea-To-Shining-Sea Memorial Trophy Dash, later shortened to the "Cannonball Run", was staged in 1971, 1972, 1975 and 1979, with the race entries including both amateur drivers and professional racers, such as Dan Gurney (who with Brock Yates "won" the 1971 event driving a Ferrari 365 GTB/4, making the  journey in under 36 hours). The stunt served as the inspiration for several Hollywood movies, such as The Gumball Rally, The Cannonball Run, Cannonball Run II, Cannonball Run III, Gone in 60 Seconds and The Fast and the Furious franchise.

See also
 Philip Llewellin

References

External links
 Car and Driver USA
 Car and Driver China Daily
 Car and Driver Brazil
 Car and Driver Greece
 Car and Driver Spain
 Car and Driver Magazine's history, features, and demographics
 Car and Driver Television at IMDB

Automobile magazines published in the United States
Monthly magazines published in the United States
Hearst Communications publications
Magazines established in 1955
Magazines published in Michigan
1955 establishments in New York City
Magazines published in New York City
Multilingual magazines
Mass media in Ann Arbor, Michigan